The Mitsubishi Mirage is a range of cars produced by the Japanese manufacturer Mitsubishi from 1978 until 2003 and again since 2012. The hatchback models produced between 1978 and 2003 were classified as subcompact cars, while the sedan and station wagon models, marketed prominently as the Mitsubishi Lancer, were the compact offerings. The liftback introduced in 1988 complemented the sedan as an additional compact offering, and the coupé of 1991 fitted in with the subcompact range. The current Mirage model is a subcompact hatchback and sedan and it replaces the Mitsubishi Colt sold between 2002 and 2012.

Nameplate history
The Mirage has a complicated marketing history, with a varied and much convoluted naming convention that differed substantially depending on the market. Mitsubishi used the Mirage name for all five generations in Japan, with all but the first series badged as such in the United States. However, other markets often utilized the name Mitsubishi Colt and sedan variants of the Mirage have been widely sold as the Mitsubishi Lancer—including in Japan where the two retailed alongside one another. In Japan, the Mirage was sold at a specific retail chain called Car Plaza.

In the United States and Canada, the first four generations were sold through a venture with Chrysler as the Dodge Colt and the similar Plymouth-badged Champ and Colt. Later, the venture brought the Eagle Vista and Summit branded models which sold alongside the aforementioned. Confusingly, Chrysler has also offered an unrelated Dodge Lancer at various stages between the 1950s and 1980s. However, when DaimlerChrysler briefly controlled Mitsubishi through the DaimlerChrysler-Mitsubishi alliance from 2000 through to 2004, the license to the "Lancer" name was relinquished to Mitsubishi for usage in North America. Thus, after the fifth and final generation Mirage, replacement models in North America have adopted the new name.

Mitsubishi introduced replacements for the fifth series of Mirage, starting in 2000 with a new generation of Lancer—now larger, having moved up to the compact segment. Then in 2002, a subcompact five-door hatchback badged Colt globally became available. By 2003, the Mirage and its derivatives had been completely phased out of mainstream Japanese production. For the 2002-era Colt's replacement in 2012, Mitsubishi decided to resurrect the Mirage name internationally for a new sixth generation model.

With the rising popularity of boxy subcompact SUVs in Japan, the Mirage nameplate was used on a domestic market-only model called the Mirage Dingo, from 1999. The Dingo was facelifted in 2001 and canceled in 2003. However, New Zealand sold a very different Mirage from 2002—a rebadged Dutch-manufactured Mitsubishi Space Star labeled Mirage Space Star. This vehicle was not very popular and was discontinued in 2003.

First generation (1978) 

Mitsubishi launched the Mirage as a front-wheel drive three-door hatchback in March 1978, as a response to the 1973 oil crisis. A five-door hatchback on a longer wheelbase arrived in September. Since most overseas markets did not have the Minica kei car, the Mirage was usually sold as Mitsubishi's entry-level model. Chassis codes were from A151 to 153 for the three-doors, with A155 and up used for the longer five-door version.

Mirage featured four-wheel independent suspension, rack and pinion steering, plus front disc brakes. Power initially came from 1,244 and 1410 cc iterations of the familiar Orion engine, putting out , respectively. Of particular note, the 1410 cc variant featured "modulated displacement"—a system that could shut down cylinders under cruising or idle conditions to reduce fuel consumption. Mitsubishi added the moderately more powerful 1.6-liter Saturn engine to the range in March 1979, for the  1600 GT model.

The Mirage also debuted Mitsubishi's Super Shift transmission, a four-speed manual with a second lever for "low" and "high" range; effectively making the transmission an eight-speed unit. The Super Shift was not originally planned. However, Mitsubishi engineers had to make use of the existing Orion engine designed for rear-wheel drive applications making use of the longitudinal engine orientation. In the Mirage, sizing constraints as a result of the front-wheel drive layout required the engine to be mounted transversely, thus causing the carburetor to face forwards and run into icing issues. However, the primary implication of the Mirage's powertrain orientation — and the issue that demanded the unconventional transmission — was the mounting of the transmission beneath the engine. This required the gearbox to take power down from the clutch, an action not possible directly as this would have dictated that the gearbox rotate in the opposite direction to that required. To overcome this, the use of an extra "idle" transfer shaft was necessitated. It was subsequently realized that for a cost no more than developing a new five-speed transmission, this shaft could be modified as a separate two-speed gearbox controlled by a secondary shift lever mounted alongside the main lever inside the cabin. The ratios on this transfer transmission were, in effect, "underdrives"—consequently marked on the second shift lever as a "power" mode due to increased performance granted by the lower gearing. In contrast, the higher overdrive setting was noted as "economy". Mitsubishi called this a unique selling proposition.

Facelift

In February 1982, Mitsubishi facelifted the Mirage range. Distinguished by the installation of flusher fitting headlamps that extended into the fender panels, stylists also designed a new grille insert. The tail lights were larger, new firmer engine and transmission mounts were fitted, and a new, lighter and more rigid transmission case was developed. The dashboard was also updated, with rotating "satellite" buttons mounted within fingertip reach for light and wiper functions. Another new version for the Japanese market was the 1600SX, a well-equipped five-door automatic fitted with the 1600GT's 88-PS engine.

At the same time as this facelift, Mitsubishi introduced a four-door sedan variant to Japan under the names Mirage Saloon and Lancer Fiore, which is not to be confused with the unrelated regular Lancer. The Fiore was often abbreviated to Lancer or Lancer F in international markets, eschewing the "Fiore" suffix. The sedan's backseat folded in a 60/40 split, just as for the hatchback. With Mirage hatchback and sedan sales in Japan restricted to the Car Plaza dealerships, the Fiore was intended to duplicate the Mirage's success at the Galant Shop — Mitsubishi's second retail sales channel. Lancer Fiore received the same 1.2- and 1.4-liter engines, and as a Mirage-derived model line, was substantially smaller than the strict Lancer. Apart from the wider axle track dictated by the switch to front-wheel drive, the original 1973-era Lancer offered a similar dimensional footprint. Unique to the four-door saloons was Mitsubishi's new "Modulated Displacement" (MD) engine, a short-lived technology which allowed the engine to run on only two cylinders while under light loads so as to save on petrol.

A more sporting turbocharged  version of the 1.4-liter engine was made available in Japan from the time of the facelift as the 1400 GT Turbo, originally only in the three-door hatchback. To handle the additional power, the suspension was made firmer, the brake servo was upgraded, and the driveshaft was changed to an equal-length design featuring a central bearing. The small turbocharger, of Mitsubishi's own manufacture, unusually sat between the intake and the twin-barrel carburetor. The engine was equipped with a knock sensor, enabling it to run on petrols of various octane ratings. The compression ratio was also unusual, fairly high for its time at 8.7 to 1. The Turbo also used the twin-range Super Shift transmission. In Japan, the Turbo was also available with the five-door hatchback bodywork, a version that was rarely exported (if at all). Japanese buyers could also opt for the new turbocharged Lancer Fiore/Mirage Saloon 1400GT; all three of these turbo versions arrived in August 1982. Mitsubishi distinguished the 1400GT with a hood mounted air intake, unique interior, uprated suspension and brakes, and the equalization of the drive shaft lengths to reduce torque steering.

In October 1982, the 1200EX Special (hatchbacks) and 1200EL Special (saloons) were launched in Japan; these were well equipped low-cost versions with heated rear windshields and other extras. The 1400MD Super and Marie limited editions were launched in December 1982. Japanese manufacture of all body variants ended in October 1983.

North America 
Chrysler imported this generation of Mirage to the North America as the Dodge Colt and Plymouth Champ from late-1978 for the 1979 model year, in three-door form only until the 1982 model year when the five-door was added. Then from the 1983 model year, Plymouth retired the Champ and adopted the name Colt as well. 0-60 time was over 12 seconds, and the top speed was 90 MPH. The Mirage Turbo was sold as the Plymouth Colt GTS Turbo, only as a two-door hatchback and fitted with a fuel-injected 1.6-litre 4G32T engine which reappeared in the next-generation Colt.

Australia and New Zealand 
The facelifted model was also manufactured as the Colt by Mitsubishi Motors Australia at their Clovelly Park, South Australia plant from 1982 to late 1989, with sufficient inventory stockpiled not exhausting until 1990. Initially offered with the 1.4- and 1.6-liter engines in five-door hatchback form, the sedan was produced from 1984.

Australian Colts were given model codes RA (from November 1980), RB (October 1982), RC (April 1984), RD (October 1986), and RE (September 1988). The RE update was distinguished by revised wheel covers, body side projection mouldings, and grille, plus the addition of body colour bumpers. The SE model was dropped, with the range opening up with the fleet-focused XL hatchback with the 1.4-litre engine and a four-speed manual gearbox, stepping up to the 1.6-litre, GLX hatchback and sedan with five-speed manual or optional three-speed automatic.

This model was also briefly exported to New Zealand in the late 1980s, where it shared showroom space with the locally assembled third generation models. Previously, local complete knock down (CKD) assembly of the Colt took place in Petone, Wellington under contract through Todd Motor Corporation (the NZ, Mitsubishi assembly franchise holders), including a variant called the Mirage Panther. The four-door saloon version (known elsewhere as Lancer Fiore) was sold as the "Mirage Geneva" in New Zealand.

Europe 
Many export markets, such as Europe and Australia received the Mirage under the Colt name. In the United Kingdom, where Colt was the marque itself, it was called the Colt 1200 and Colt 1400, after the engine displacements. In most of Europe, it was sold as the Mitsubishi Colt. The Lancer Fiore (sometimes called Lancer F) arrived in early 1983, which is also when the facelift appeared in Europe. Max power was reached at 5000 rather than 5500 rpm for the Japanese market models, and they were fitted with somewhat gentler cams for a less peaky power delivery. Some European markets also received the  Turbo model, which arrived in late 1982. After the introduction of the second generation Mirage/Colt, the original model remained available in Belgium (at least) as the "Mitsubishi Magnum", only offered as a three-door with the smallest engine and bare-bones equipment.

Second generation (1983) 

Mitsubishi launched the second generation Mirage to Japan in 1983, again splitting the range into Mirage (three- and five-door hatchback, plus four-door sedan) and Lancer Fiore (four-door sedan) models. A station wagon version of the Mirage was added in 1985, with a four-wheel drive wagon available from the fall of 1986 with the 1.8-liter gasoline engine. Many export markets sold the hatchbacks as Mirage or Colt, with the sedan and wagon commonly badged Lancer. This wagon model went on to become very popular in both the commercial and private sectors overseas as well as in Japan. C10-series chassis numbers denote front-wheel-drive models, while C30-series numbers are for four-wheel-drive versions (only station wagons).

Uprated engines were deployed into the series; 1.3- and 1.5-liter Orion gasoline engines replaced the previous 1.2- and 1.4-liter Orion units. Mitsubishi also released variants fitted with the 1.6 and 1.8-liter Sirius gasoline powerplants, and for the first time a 1.8-liter Sirius diesel was added. Power differed for cars with catalyzers, or for markets with lower octane fuel.

The car received a very mild facelift in early 1986, along with some new engine options for the Japanese domestic market. This included a fuel-injected version of a new 1.5-liter engine from the Saturn family, the G31B. The transmissions were updated at the same time. In October 1986, the sedans and hatchbacks were rebadged "Mirage NOW" for the Japanese market. The change included better equipment and a revised lineup, going from the basic XF via the better equipped XL to the mildly sporty X1 X on top. The X1 X featured an Italvolanti steering wheel and alloy wheels by Porsche Design. Also new was the competitively priced and comprehensively equipped Marion version, only available in the three-door body with the 1.3-liter engine, aimed specifically at young female buyers. Meanwhile, the Van received additional safety equipment such as a laminated front windshield and ELR belts, while the 1500 CX Wagon gained power steering and bronze window tint. The second generation Mirage hatchback was replaced in October 1987; the sedans were replaced in January 1988.

The Wagon and Van versions were kept in production with some minor updates until 1991, as there was no station wagon of the third generation Mirage and Lancer. The diesel engine remained the 1.8-liter 4D65 (also available with four-wheel drive) while the petrol 4G13 and 4G15 were updated with the same new twelve-valve heads as were used on the third generation Mirage beginning in 1989.

Export
Europe
The Mirage was available in Europe as the Colt in 1200 L, EL, and GL trims (mostly three-door models only, but a five-door GL was sold in some markets), as the 1300 GL three- and five-door, 1500 GLX three- and five-door, and as the 1800 L/EL/GL (diesel) three- or five-door. The Lancer sedan was available in the same trim levels as the hatchback model (including the 1200 engine), while the wagon versions were available as 1500 GLX and 1800 GL diesel only. The three-door Colt Turbo was also sold in Europe, with the  1.6-liter ECI engine. The Colt Turbo fared badly in competition with its European GTi-class competitors, with period testers criticizing Mitsubishi for not doing much more than adding a turbocharger, spoilers, and fat tires. It was not a thorough engineering job and the car was not able to fully handle the ample power made available.

Some markets also received the 4WD Wagon with the larger 1.8-liter engine, although the diesel-powered 4WD remained available to Japanese customers only. Versions equipped with catalytic converters first became available in Europe in 1985, at the same time as the wagon was introduced. The two-seater commercial type was sold in the Netherlands simply as the "Mitsubishi Wagon", whereas the better equipped passenger version was called the Lancer Station Wagon.

North America
The Mirage was not sold in the United States by Mitsubishi until the 1985 model year. Mitsubishi licensed the "Mirage" name from Grand Touring Cars, Inc. of Scottsdale, Arizona for use in the United States, as they already owned the rights to the name with the Mirage race car series. While Dodge/Plymouth Colt-branded models were available with four-door sedan bodywork as well as a short-lived five-door hatchback - from model year 1988 also a station wagon - Mitsubishi originally marketed the Mirage only as a three-door hatch through its own American dealers despite the five-door model having repeatedly been rejected by Chrysler's marketing organization in favor of the Dodge Omni. The 1985 Mirage's equipment levels were Base, L, LS, and Turbo, with prices set a few hundred dollars beneath those of its Dodge/Plymouth equivalents. The well-equipped LS model was dropped after the first model year, and in 1987 a four-door sedan was added to the lineup. For 1988, only the Turbo Sport hatchback and naturally aspirated standard 4-door sedan remained in price listings, as the new Mitsubishi Precis supplanted the basic hatchback Mirage.

New Zealand
A commercial version of the wagon was sold in New Zealand as the Mitsubishi Express, replacing an earlier model based on the Galant Sigma. The second generation Mirage range was also assembled in New Zealand, but was never sold in Australia, where the original version was kept in production until the third generation replaced it in 1988.

Southeast Asia
Mitsubishi in Thailand released the three-door hatchback and four-door sedan models with 1.3- and 1.5-liter engine as the Mitsubishi Champ in 1983. Later the series was renamed Mitsubishi Champ II and Champ III, with the hatchback and 1.5-liter versions discontinued. The Champ was retired in 1994.

In Indonesia, both the sedan and the 5-door hatchback were sold under the Lancer nameplate. Available in two trim levels, SL with 1.4-liter engine and GLX with 1.6-liter engine.

The four-door sedan formed the basis of the Proton Saga, Malaysia's first locally built car and manufactured between 1985 and 2008. Proton would later spin the Saga off into its own five-door hatchback called the Saga Aeroback in 1987 (longer, and styled differently from Mitsubishi's own five-door hatchback version).

Third generation (1987) 

Mitsubishi introduced the more rounded, third-generation Mirage to Japan in October 1987. Masaru Furukawa headed the vehicle design, with Yasukichi Akamatsu given the role of chief engineer. The basic model, a three-door hatchback with upright tailgate and large glasshouse arrived first. The sedan, released to Japan in January 1988 was stylistically distinct with almost vertical rear glass, influenced by the larger Galant. The range was complemented by a five-door liftback in June 1988, but without a station wagon variant, Mitsubishi persevered with the previous model until the release of a new wagon on the fourth generation chassis. As before, Mirage, Colt, and Lancer naming varied between markets with different body shapes often having different titles in the same market. In Japan, sedans were available with the Mirage and Lancer nameplates, while the three-door was sold only as Mirage, and the liftback only as Lancer. Japanese Mirage sedans usually featured the "Vie Saloon" suffix.

Engines available were 1.3- and 1.5-liter Orion gasoline inline-fours and 1.8-liter Saturn gasoline inline-four. For Greece only, a 1.2-liter version of Orion engine available in the entry-level models outputted . The 1.8-liter Sirius diesel carried over from the previous shape. In Japan, four-wheel-drive versions were also available, fitted with the carbureted 1.5 and fuel-injected 1.6-liter gasoline engines, or 1.8-liter diesel. The top Mirages in Japan were called the "Cyborg", featuring the turbocharged 1.6-liter motor developing  — the same unit as fitted to the GSR sedan.

Facelift 
The third generation received a minor facelift in September 1989, with late models receiving the same modernized engines as were seen in the subsequent generation. In its most potent turbocharged variant, the new 4G61 engine produced  at 6000 rpm.

Markets
European versions were available as the 1300 GL, 1500 GLX, 1600 GTi-16V, and 1800 diesels, with the three-door labelled Colt and the sedan and liftback called Lancer. Mitsubishi retailed a Colt "van" in select European markets, being the three-door body without rear side windows and therefore attracting reduced taxation in these jurisdictions. A few months later, this version also became available with a non-catalyzed engine for those European markets that still eschewed emissions controls. The next generation Lancer did not include a five-door hatchback; since this was a popular bodystyle in Europe Mitsubishi kept offering this model until mid-1994. Beginning in June 1992, the higher line models were fitted with the new 1.6 and 1.8-litre engines from the 4G9 engine family; a  version of the 12-valve 1.3 was also on offer.

Since first generation Mirages were still under Australian production as the Colt, all three third generation body types were sold under the Lancer name in that market. Initially, the Australian-specification models were designated as the CA series when introduced in 1988, adopting the CB designation for the 1990 facelift. The liftback continued to be sold in Australia alongside the fourth generation (CC) Mirage-derived Lancer from 1992 through to 1996. Confusingly, the carry-over liftback was also given this CC model designation.

North American three-door and sedan sales occurred under the Mitsubishi Mirage name for the 1989 to 1992 model years. Badge engineered variants were also sold in the US as the Dodge/Plymouth Colt (three-door only), and Eagle Summit. In Canada, a Dodge/Plymouth sedan was also offered as the Mitsubishi brand did not operate in the market until the 2003 model year.

Model codes

Fourth generation (1991; CA/CB/CC/CD) 

In October 1991, the fourth generation Mirage made its debut for the Japanese market alongside the related Lancer. Departing from the previous series, the new Mirage adopted a much rounder body shape — a change duplicated by much of the automotive industry in the early-1990s. As before, the Japanese Mirage lineup comprised the three-door hatchback (now called Mirage Cyborg) and sedan (now with a six-window glasshouse), plus a new coupé body type suffixed Asti. Lancer variants sold in Japan offered unique body variants — a four-windowed sedan and, from May 1992, a station wagon simply named Mitsubishi Libero. This model was sold as the Lancer Wagon in most export markets, where its introduction coincided with a small update for 1993, featuring new bumpers and adjustments to the engine lineup. The Lancer wagon was sold until 2003 in the Australian and New Zealand markets, primarily for fleet buyers. The wagon was still listed on a dealer website until 2012 in Belize.

Unlike prior generations, the Japanese market Lancer range co-existed with greater differentiation when compared to the Mirage. The Mirage with its sportier appearance and tapered hood, featured elliptical headlamps with a very narrow single-port grille. Lancer variants diverged with more angular styling characterized by the more upright design. The Lancer also featured re-shaped fenders, less rounded headlamps, and a larger dual-port grille. Although both were built on the same platform, the Japanese-specification Lancer sedan received different sheet metal than the Mirage equivalent. More traditional in silhouette, the Lancer sedan (suffixed Vie Saloon) featured a simple four-window glasshouse, whereas the Mirage sedan adopted a more modern six-window glasshouse with abbreviated trunk.

Naming of the various models for export was many and varied. As a Mitsubishi, the three-door was restricted to the Mirage and Colt names, but the Mirage Asti coupé was often badged Lancer as well. With the sedan, export markets only retailed the four-window variation as a Mitsubishi, although this occurred under both the Lancer and Mirage names.

Mitsubishi's powertrain choices were vast with this new platform. Front-wheel drive was most common, with all-wheel drive available for some models. Engines ranged from 1.3- to 1.8-liter naturally-aspirated gasoline inline-fours, 1.8 and 2.0-liter turbocharged versions of the same, plus 1.8 and 2.0-liter diesels. Notably, a gasoline V6 engine variant displacing just 1.6-liters was also offered, making it the smallest ever mass-produced V6.

Many performance models were offered in this generation. The entry level model is powered with 1.6-liter DOHC inline-four engine producing  was sold as "Mirage R, RS, Super R, Cyborg or Cyborg R" and "Lancer MR" in Japan. The 1.8-liter turbocharged inline-four, producing , was sold as a "Lancer GSR or RS" and from September 1993, formed the basis of the Lancer Evolution I that used the 2.0-liter 4G63 engine from the successful Galant VR-4 rally car. An electric version of the wagon was released to Japan named the "Lancer Libero EV" and utilizing a nickel–cadmium battery.

Australia
Australian market versions of this generation were released in late 1992 and were officially referred to as the CC series Lancer. Buyers had the choice of the Lancer coupé (available in GL and GLXi equipment levels), sedan (GL, Executive, and GSR), and wagon (Executive). Five-speed manual transmission came fitted as standard, with all variants except the GSR available with automatic—three gears for the base coupé and sedan—and a four-speed unit for the remainder of the lineup. The GL coupé and sedan featured the 1.5-liter carbureted motor, with the 1.8-liter fuel-injected engine reserved for the rest of the series. All engines except in the GSR are single overhead camshaft design; the GSR featured double overhead camshafts, plus a turbocharger and intercooler.

North America
This model launched in the United States for the 1993 model year as the Mirage, with all variants now sourced from Japan (instead of Japan or Illinois as previously). The same body shapes were also sold as the Dodge and Plymouth Colt in both the United States and Canada. The six-window greenhouse sedan was sold in these countries as the Eagle Summit alongside a coupé of the same name. For the Mitsubishi branded versions sold only in the United States, the coupé and four-window sedan were offered in base, S, ES and LS trim levels. Five-speed manual transmission was standard, although an automatic was optional on all Mirages except the S coupé. For the 1994 model year, Mitsubishi introduced a driver's airbag, the LS sedan lost its optional anti-lock brakes, and the LS coupé gained the 1.8-liter engine previously exclusive to sedans. The 1994 model year was the last year of retail sales for Mirage sedans (which became limited to fleets) and for the Dodge and Plymouth Colts altogether, although the Eagle Summit sedan and coupé remained on sale alongside the Mirage coupé through to 1996. As a consequence, only S and LS Mirage coupés returned for model year 1995, and both benefitted from a new passenger's side airbag and covered center console (and therefore the deletion of the motorized front seatbelts). The 1995 Mirage LS coupé gained uprated 14-inch wheels, but deleted access to power windows, power door locks, and cruise control.

Proton versions

Mitsubishi granted Proton in Malaysia a license to the fourth generation design from 1993 — it remained in produced in a distant form until 2010. The first variant produced, the sedan was badged Proton Wira (1993–2007) and was complemented by a Proton-designed five-door Wira hatchback (1993–2004). Malaysian manufacture of other variants commenced later, with the three-door Satria (1994–2005) and Putra coupé (1996–2000; and 2004–2005). Proton then developed a coupé utility variant which came to fruition in 2002 as the Arena, lasting until 2010.

Fifth generation (1995) 

The release of the fifth generation Mirage to Japan in October 1995 introduced a rationalized lineup as a result of the fragile post-bubble economy in Japan. Three body types were issued: first, the three-door hatchback and sedan, then in December 1995, the two-door coupé (Asti). While the sedan grew slightly in size, the coupé shrunk modestly. It was bumped from the subcompact class to compact in the United States. Whereas the previous Mirage sedan sold in Japan featured a six-window profile, the 1995 redesign shared its styling with the Lancer except for minor differences in trim.

For the Lancer, these included a different trunk lid, amber front turn signal lamps, and a restyled grille garnish. No station wagon of this generation was offered, although the previous generation wagon continued over the entire fifth generation production run. While only the sedan formed part of the Lancer range in Japan, both the coupé and sedan were labeled as Mirage and Lancer in export markets. Between 1995 and 2004, the Mitsubishi Carisma supplanted the sedan in some European markets.

A minor facelift arrived in 1997. Of note, the Lancer sedan featured a new grille and reshaped inner-portions of the headlamps to better differentiate it from the Mirage donor model. Both the coupé and sedan benefited from redesigned tail lamps, whereas the three-door only received a redesigned front bumper incorporating a larger grille. In 1997, a classically styled version of the Mirage three-door hatchback became available in Japan, badged Mirage Modarc. The Modarc featured chrome for the grille, side mirrors, door handles, and bumper strips; it also included fog lights and optional alloy wheels. In 2001, the Mirage-based models gained a chrome-trimmed grille insert in limited markets.

Although a new, substantially larger and more expensive generation of Lancer sedan arrived in 2000, many export markets retained the Mirage-derived model up until 2003 when Japanese manufacture concluded and Mitsubishi retired the "Mirage" nameplate worldwide. This is especially true of the hatchback and coupé which were not redesigned due to Mitsubishi's financial troubles. In other markets, the newer sedan often co-existed with the old as a more premium offering. Mitsubishi eventually replaced the three-door in 2005 for Europe only with the three-door Colt—the name previously used in many export markets to denote the Mirage from 1978 onwards. A five-door variant of the Colt had earlier been released in 2002. By 2003, the only Mirage sold in Japan was the coupé, now without the Asti designation. Mitsubishi did not tender a replacement for the coupé.

European three-door CJO series models of this generation were sold between 1995 and 2001 as the Colt. Sedans and wagons sold as Lancers.

Australia
This generation was sold in Australia between 1996 and 2003, designated the CE series. Like the previous generation, this model was available as a coupé and sedan (badged Lancer), and as the three-door titled Mirage. The Lancer wagon lingered on as a CE model, despite being a facelifted remnant of the previous generation. Towards the end of its model run, Mitsubishi introduced several limited editions (based on the GLi) to remain competitive with its rivals. These extras such as sports interiors, alloy wheels, and body kits. Despite the introduction of the new generation Lancer sedan to Australia in 2002, the CE continued alongside it until production ended in 2003, including the sedan which remained as the basic GLi. The coupé was now only available in GLi and MR trims.

United States
In the United States, the fifth generation Mirage arrived for the 1997 model year and was again available in sedan and coupé versions. The 1.5- 4G15 and 1.8-liter engines from the previous iteration returned in DE and LS trims, respectively. The 1998 model year brought a stronger starter and battery; 1999 introduced a minor facelift, plainer seat fabric; and for the LS coupé, white-faced gauges and a tachometer with either transmission (it was formerly exclusive to the manual). For 2000, Mitsubishi added further standard equipment, plus the standardization of the 1.8-liter engine for the DE sedan; anti-lock brakes were deleted from the options list. Mitsubishi renamed the DE sedan as ES for model year 2001. Mirage sedans were replaced with the next generation Lancer for 2002, although the coupé lingered on for 2002 in North America. The production of the model year 1999 Mirage sedans was greatly lowered due to the large demand for the Eclipse; there were only 4,783 Mirage DE (Deluxe Edition) units produced and 3,829 Mirage sedans exported for that model year. In Puerto Rico, the Mirage was sold as the Mitsubishi Technica and Mirage Technica.

Venezuela
Venezuela received this series in 1998 as a Lancer where it remained until 2001. After this, the next generation Lancer entered the market and local production of the old sedan recommenced between 2003 and 2010 under the Mitsubishi Signo name. Variants of the Signo comprise the base 1.3-liter GLi, and the 1.6-liter "Plus" and "Taxi" trims.

Philippines
In the Philippines, MMPC introduced it in 1996 as the Lancer sedan. Initially it was offered in three grades; EL, GL, and the top-spec GLXi which are locally assembled at MMPC's cainta assembly plant. The EL & GL grades are powered by either a 1.3 or 1.5L carburated engine, while the GLXi is powered by a 1.6L inline-four engine all paired to a standard 5-speed manual or a 4-speed automatic transmission (GL & GLXi only).

In 1997, MMPC added the Limited Saloon & 2-door GSR coupe variants to the lineup. Both grades are still powered by the 1.6L inline-four engine with a choice of a standard 5-speed manual or INVECS 4-speed automatic transmission. The "Limited Saloon" featured redesigned grille, leather upholstery, JBL speakers, taillight garnish, power adjustable seats (driver side only), keyless entry among other features.

In 1998, the 2-door Lancer known as the Lancer GSR received a facelift. It featured strut bar, leather steering wheel and seats, Dual airbags, and ABS. The Lancer GSR is powered by the same 1.6L four-cylinder engine found on the GLXi & Limited Saloon grades. It is paired to a INVECS 4-speed automatic transmission.

In 1999, Mitsubishi added another trim the "MX" to compete with Nissan's "Sentra Exalta" & Toyota's "Corolla SE-G". The MX trim is powered by a 1.6L inline-four engine coupled to a 5-speed automatic transmission with manu-matic shift mode respectively. It featured leather seats, automatic climate control and wood paneling.

By mid-2000, Mitsubishi axed the EL & GL model trims in favor of the Lancer "1.6 GLS" trim which featured redesigned front-end & cloth seats. It was launched in 2001.

Indian production 
This series also entered Indian production in June 1998 as the Lancer, assembled by Hindustan Motors. Available model variants were LX sedans with either the 1.5-liter gasoline engine or 2.0-liter diesel and a five-speed manual transmission. The gasoline option produces  while the diesel only offered . The Lancer was joined by the Lancer Cedia in 2006 and continued to be sold alongside that model until discontinued in 2012.

Chinese production
This generation Lancer entered production in the Chinese market as the Soueast Lioncel in March 2003 and was produced by Soueast Motors up to 2005. Pricing for the Lioncel ranged between 84,000 yuan and 159,800 yuan (12,150 to US$23,120) for the 2004 model year and 78,900 to 133,800 yuan (11,415 to US$19,360) for the 2005 model year. A separate car called the Mitsubishi Lancer was also produced by the manufacturer and a modified version was known as Mitsubishi Lancer S-Design and was shown at the Guangzhou Auto Show in 2014. Production for the Lancer started in May 2006 and ended in 2015. The standard engine was the 1.6-litre 4G18 engine paired with a 5-speed manual gearbox for the Lancer Classic and Lioncel. A 4-speed automatic was available on the Lancer. Trim levels for the Lancer were the 1.6 SEi (manual and automatic), 1.6 EXi (manual and automatic) and 1.6 EXi Sports (manual and automatic) with price ranging from 94,800 yuan to 122,800 yuan (15,020 to US$19,460). The Lioncel also shares these trim levels.

Another variant called the Soueast Lingyue is a facelifted version of the Lancer and successor to the Lioncel and was produced by Soueast Motors from October 2008 to December 2019. The facelifted Lingyue was launched in August 2010. The Soueast Lingyue ran on a 1.5-litre 4G15 engine for the 2008 model year only where it was replaced by the 1.5-litre 4A91 engine for 2009 models onwards. The Lingyue comes with a 5-speed manual gearbox as standard and a CVT option was available from 2010 to 2014.

Successor 

When Mitsubishi introduced a new independent generation of Lancer in 2000 (without a corresponding Mirage), the old Mirage-based sedan was discontinued in Japan, although production continued for export. The next phase in the Mirage's demise was the release of the Colt—a five-door hatchback—in 2002. The Colt replaced the Mirage hatchback, despite the latter being a three-door. Unlike its predecessor, the Colt featured a tall, upright design with a short engine compartment to maximize interior dimensions. Engines for the Colt comprised 1.1-liter three-cylinder, plus 1.3-, 1.5-, and 1.6-liter gasoline inline-fours with a standard five-speed manual and optional continuously variable transmission (automatic).

Sales in export markets did not occur until 2004, with production in Japan no longer being the primary source. European models were instead sourced from Born, the Netherlands with a three-door body produced exclusively at this factory from 2004. Also in 2004, the Colt Plus was launched as a longer version of the standard five-door with greater luggage capacity. Then in 2006, the range expanded further with the release of the Colt CZC—a convertible with a retractable hardtop roof. Colt convertibles were produced only at the Netherlands facility, with final assembly taking part with Pininfarina at Turin, Italy.

Manufacture of the Colt ended in 2012, with the successor model reverting to the Mirage name internationally. Unlike the Colt's expensive architecture shared with the Smart Forfour, the emphasis on the Mirage is low pricing to increase Mitsubishi's presence in emerging markets.

Sixth generation (A00/LA, A10; 2012) 

The Colt was renamed back to Mirage in 2012. The sixth generation was previewed as a concept car at the 2011 Geneva International Motor Show, with series production cars unveiled at the 2011 Tokyo Motor Show. For some European markets, the name Mitsubishi Space Star is used. The model code is A00, although in Australia it is referred to as the LA.

The Mirage is built at Mitsubishi Thailand's Laem Chabang plant, facility number three since 19 April 2012. The car is mainly developed as a response to the Eco Car policy endorsed by the Thailand government. The car effectively doubled Mitsubishi sales figures in the country. Shipments to Japan began in July, with the Australian hitting the market in January 2013. Mitsubishi Motors Philippines began manufacturing both the hatchback and G4 sedan variants of the Mirage for the country's market in January 2017.

In designing the Mirage, Mitsubishi's objectives were affordability (including in developing economies) and high efficiency. To aid efficiency, minimizing vehicle mass was one engineering focus. "Painstaking efforts to reduce weight", including the use of high-tensile steel in the body, resulted in a vehicle that is the lightest in its segment in some markets. In North America, it is the lightest 4-door car available (only the 2-passenger Smart Fortwo is lighter).

Reducing aerodynamic drag was another primary design goal. One of the car's aerodynamic features resulted in a new patent application. The result is the lowest drag coefficient (Cd) in its class. Depending on drivetrain and options, the car's Cd ranges from 0.27 to 0.31.

Markets 
Early Japanese models has 1.0-litre 3-cylinder engine with Auto Stop & Go (AS&G), CVT and 165/65 R14 tires. The 1.0-litre three-cylinder car for the Japanese market achieves  in the JC08 cycle and will have a sub-1 million yen price tag.

The Thai market model was unveiled at the 2012 Bangkok International Motor Show on 28 March 2012. The Thai model features the 1.2-litre three-cylinder engine with start-stop, fitted with a CVT or manual transmission.

In the Philippines, the Mirage was launched in mid-2012 and was initially offered in GLX and GLS grade levels. Both available with either 5-speed manual transmission or CVT. All models are powered by the 1.2-litre engine. In late 2013, the sedan version called G4 was added to the lineup and also available in the same 2 grades as the hatchback. In its first full year of sales (2013), the Mirage reached a place as the sixth best selling hatchback. The refreshed Mirage launched in the country in April 2016 and the G4 also launched in April 2018. In 2019, the GLS grade was removed from the lineup, leaving only the GLX as the sole grade.

In Indonesia, the Mirage was launched on 17 September 2012 and is imported from Thailand. It is offered in GLX, GLS and Exceed grade levels. The GLX grade is available with 5-speed manual transmission, while GLS and Exceed grades are available with CVT. All models are powered by the 1.2-litre engine. On January 19, 2015, the updated Mirage was launched alongside the launch of the Mirage Sport. The updated Mirage has a 15-inch rim size, which is larger than the previous Mirage's 14-inch rim size. The Mirage Sport is based on a GLS grade with a body kit and DRLs. The facelifted Mirage was released on 26 July 2016. The Mirage was discontinued in the Indonesian market in 2018.

The North American edition was unveiled at the 2013 Salon International de l'auto de Montreal. Despite previous speculation, the car will be marketed as Mirage in the United States and Canada for the 2014 model year. Canada/U.S. models include 1.2-litre three-cylinder MIVEC engine, five-speed manual transmission or CVT, choice of eight body colors (Kiwi Green, Thunder Gray, Sapphire Blue, InfraRed, Cloud White, Starlight Silver, Plasma Purple and Mystic Black). There was no 2016 model year in the North American market.

First facelift
At the 2015 LA Auto Show, Mitsubishi previewed the Mirage's 2017 facelift. The car received a new front end design, projector headlights with LED daytime running lights, and LED tail lights. The facelift results in a drag coefficient of 0.27cd. In addition, engine output was increased from 74 to 78 hp, the suspension was improved through better shock absorbers, revised spring rates, and uprated brakes (larger discs on front, drums on rear, and different friction material). The interior will also see numerous aesthetic changes from the steering wheel to the HVAC system and a new optional touchscreen infotainment system using Apple's CarPlay interface and a 300W Rockford Fosgate audio setup.

Second facelift
The second facelift Mirage was launched in Thailand on 18 November 2019, adding safety features such as forward collision mitigation system, radar sensing forward mitigation along with cruise control buttons on the steering wheel. Its bumper design has been revised to bear the design language of its other Mitsubishi models together with a projector headlamp with DRL and LED inlets for the tail-lamps. The updated Mirage debuted in North America in early 2021 as a 2021 model.

In June 2021, an off-road look Space Star Cross is launched in Portugal.

Sedan (A10) 
The four-door sedan version of the Mirage, known as Mitsubishi Attrage or Mitsubishi Mirage G4 in some markets, has been manufactured at Mitsubishi's Laem Chabang plant in Thailand since June 2013. While based on the hatchback, the sedan is unique from the back doors rearwards, and has revised front styling. The sedan was first introduced as a concept car at the 2013 Bangkok International Motor Show called the Concept G4 sedan. Like the hatchback, the sedan is offered with a 1.2-liter engine.

According to Masaaki Yamada, senior adviser for Mitsubishi Motors Philippines, the company used the Mirage G4 name in the Philippine market, as they claimed the "Attrage" nameplate has a negative connotation in the Filipino language. "Attrage" sounds too much like atrás, Filipino or Spanish for "going backwards". The Mirage G4 was released in the Philippine dealerships in October 2013.

In Mexico, the Attrage is sold as the Dodge Attitude, replacing the Hyundai Accent (RB) from January 2015 model after Hyundai's arrival in the Mexican market.

The Attrage is sold in few Western European markets such as Austria, Switzerland, Belgium and Luxembourg. The engine is available as a 1.2-liter three-cylinder engine that produces 59 kW (80 hp). A continuously variable transmission is available as an option. The Attrage is also sold in Singapore, Turkey, Malaysia, Israel and the Middle East.

For the US market, the Mirage G4 sedan was available from spring 2016 as a 2017 model. It is available in ES and SE trims, with 7 airbags available as standard.

In Canada, sales of the G4 sedan ran 3 model years, from 2017 to 2019.  It was cancelled owing to low sales relative to the hatchback (the G4 made up less than 20% of total Mirage sales in 2018).

Starting on 1 February 2019, the Mitsubishi Mirage G4 has been sold in Mexico alongside the return of Mitsubishi in the Mexican market, coexisting with the Dodge Attitude. It was facelifted in August 2020.

The Attrage received its facelift in Thailand on 18 November 2019 with the same front fascia as the second facelift Mirage hatchback.

In the Philippines, the Mirage G4 received its facelift on 28 August 2021. It is offered in the same trim models as the pre-facelift model: GLX (manual & CVT) and GLS (CVT only).

In January 2022, a limited-edition GLS Sport was introduced. Based on the GLS trim, the GLS Sport features sideskirts, grille garnish, and rear lip spoiler. Only 300 units were produced.

The limited-edition Black Series was introduced in November 2022. Based on the GLS trim, the Black Series features front grille red accent, black-painted side mirrors, and high-gloss black 15-inch alloy wheels. It is also packed with enhancements such as the new floor LED illumination and center console LED illumination, both in blue, it also comes with a center arm rest console and a trunk luggage tray as standard. Only 150 units will be produced.

Reception
The current Mirage has proven to be a polarizing design. It has been met with negative reviews in some markets, and praise in others. Favorable reviews highlight the efficiency of the design, while critics often illustrate the car's shortcomings, with a tendency to compare the Mirage with more expensive cars.

Auto Express and Ollie Kew of Car Magazine all gave the car a two out of five star rating. Peter Anderson of The Motor Report gave it two-and-a-half out of five stars.   What Car? magazine rated the Mirage 3 out of 5 stars for "cost and verdict." Matt Jones of Top Gear magazine gave the Mirage an Overall Verdict of 3 out of 10. Sam Wollaston of The Guardian gave the car a Cool Factor rating of 3 out of 10. Consumer Reports placed the Mirage among the 10 Worst Cars of 2013 and Top Gear magazine placed the Mirage on its list of "The worst cars you can buy right now."

Jason Torchinsky of Jalopnik gave the 2014 Mirage an 8 out of 10 for Value and even went on to criticize critics of the Mirage for excessive criticism, saying "I get the appeal of writing a bad review — they're a hell of a lot more fun to write than a good review... But you have to keep that critic-lust in check, sometimes, and try and really get to the truth of things."

On the positive side, Kelley Blue Book gave the Mirage an overall rating of 6.2 (with a Consumer Rating of 9.4/10), quoting that "If the most important thing to you is getting the cheapest new car you can find with the most equipment and best possible fuel economy, you'll like the 2015 Mitsubishi Mirage." The Mirage was named one of Forbes magazine's 12 Greenest Cars of 2014, and was one of two non-hybrid vehicles on the list. In the Philippines, the Mirage was awarded the "2012–2013 Car of the Year" by the Car Awards Group. Top Gear Philippines rated the car 18 out of 20, and stated, "For the single person or young couple on a budget, the Mirage is still the sweetest deal in town." In Denmark, the Space Star received largely positive reviews, and was the fifth most sold car in January–February 2015.  The Hispanic Motor Press awarded the Mirage as Best Subcompact in 2014 and recognized the Mirage G4 as Best Subcompact in 2017.  Company Vehicle of New Zealand praises the Mirage, calling it “an ideal city commuter which is absolutely effortless to slip into even the tightest of parking spaces”.  The Automotive Science Group has recognized the Mirage for Best All-Around Performance and Best Economic Performance.  Patrick Rall of Torque News praised the 2018 Mirage GT, noting it as a "great winter commuter car" with "lots of features".  Brian Wong of Cars.com called the Mirage GT "fun to drive" and praised its light-weight design.  Erik Shilling notes that after eight years on the market, "the Mirage is probably the best kind of car there is: a cheap car that functions, and isn’t pretending otherwise."

Safety 
ASEAN NCAP test results for a right-hand-drive, five-door hatchback variant on a 2013 registration:

Production and sales

Production 

(Sources: Facts & Figures 2013, Facts & Figures 2018, Facts & Figures 2019, Mitsubishi Motors website)

Sales

References

Bibliography

External links 

 Mitsubishi pages: Mirage, Attrage
Mitsubishi Mirage U.S.website
Mitsubishi Mirage G4 U.S.website
 Mitsubishi web museum pages: 1978, 1983, 1985 Mirage/Lancer wagon, 1987, 1991, 1995, 1999 Dingo
 Gazoo pages: 1st gen, 2nd gen, 3rd gen, 4th gen, 5th gen
 Dodge Attitude Mexican website (in Spanish)

1970s cars
1980s cars
1990s cars
2000s cars
2010s cars
All-wheel-drive vehicles
Cars introduced in 1978
Compact cars
Coupés
Front-wheel-drive vehicles
Hatchbacks
Mirage
Sedans
Station wagons
Subcompact cars
ASEAN NCAP superminis
Vehicles with CVT transmission